John Henry Smith, better known as Big Bad Smitty (February 11, 1940 – April 3, 2002) was an American blues guitar player and singer. Born in Vicksburg, Mississippi, United States, he started learning guitar at the age of ten. He would play his older brother Nelson's guitar when nobody was around.

When he was in his 20s he worked as a truck driver. Johnny Vincent of Ace Records had recorded him and two of his songs, "Smokestack Lightnin'" and "How Many More Years" appeared on the Genuine Mississippi Blues anthology on the Ace label in 1970.

He recorded the Mean Disposition album in 1991, which was released on the Black Magic label in Europe and the GENES label in the United States. He recorded three albums and appeared at European blues festivals, performing for large crowds. In 1993, Smitty was affected by a stroke.

He died in Jackson, Mississippi on April 3, 2002, as a result of diabetes. His funeral was held on April 13 at the Alpha Omega Baptist Church in Jackson, Mississippi.

A benefit concert was held for the family of Big Bad Smitty at BB's in St Louis.

Releases
 Mean Disposition (1991)

References

External links
Artist Direct
Big Bad Smitty-Unwired Roots review

1940 births
2002 deaths
American blues guitarists
American male guitarists
American blues singers
Deaths from diabetes
20th-century American singers
20th-century American guitarists
20th-century American male singers